Frances Helen Aitchison (6 December 1881 – 26 May 1947) was a Sunderland-born tennis player who competed in the 1912 Summer Olympics.

In 1912 she won the silver medal with her partner Herbert Barrett in the indoor mixed doubles competition. She also participated in the indoor singles event but was eliminated in the quarter-finals.

Background
Aitchison was born in Sunderland in 1881, the eldest daughter of shipbuilder James Aitchison and his wife Mary, of Grange Terrace, later The Cedars. She competed in the County Championships of 1907 with three of her sisters, Alice, Kathleen and Sibyl, helping Durham to defeat Middlesex 5–4.

Aitchison entered the Wimbledon Championships for the first time in 1909, at the age of 27, winning the Ladies Doubles title with partner Agnes Tuckey. She also competed in 1910, 1911, 1913 and 1914, reaching three semi-finals and two quarter-finals in the Ladies Singles. In 1913 she won the singles title at World Covered Court Championship in Stockholm, defeating Kate Gillou in the final in straight sets. Her success at the Stockholm Olympics in 1912 made her the first person from Sunderland to become an Olympic medalist.

At Epsom in 1914 she married John Leisk.

References

External links
Olympics profile

1881 births
1947 deaths
English female tennis players
English Olympic medallists
Olympic silver medallists for Great Britain
Olympic tennis players of Great Britain
Sportspeople from Sunderland
Tennis players at the 1912 Summer Olympics
Olympic medalists in tennis
Medalists at the 1912 Summer Olympics
British female tennis players
Tennis people from Tyne and Wear